The Men's 800m T36 had its Final held on September 16 at 11:03.

Medalists

Results

References
Final

Athletics at the 2008 Summer Paralympics